James H. "Jumpin' Jimmy" Washington (born July 1, 1943) is a former professional basketball player.  A 6'6" forward born in Philadelphia and from Villanova University, he was selected by the St. Louis Hawks with the 6th pick of the 1965 NBA Draft.  After one year with the Hawks, he joined the Chicago Bulls, where he became a fan favorite as the first Bull to average more than ten rebounds per game.

In 1967–1968, he averaged 12.5 points and 10.1 rebounds per game. During the 1968 NBA playoffs, he averaged postseason career-highs of 17.2 points and 15 rebounds as the Bulls lost in the first round to the Los Angeles Lakers. The following season, Washington averaged 14 points and 10.6 rebounds.  Washington would also play for the Philadelphia 76ers, Atlanta Hawks (a later incarnation of the St. Louis Hawks), and the Buffalo Braves and retired with 6,637 career rebounds.

References

External links
Career Stats

1943 births
Living people
African-American basketball players
Atlanta Hawks players
Buffalo Braves players
Chicago Bulls expansion draft picks
Chicago Bulls players
Philadelphia 76ers players
Power forwards (basketball)
St. Louis Hawks draft picks
St. Louis Hawks players
Villanova Wildcats men's basketball players
American men's basketball players
Basketball players from Philadelphia
21st-century African-American people
20th-century African-American sportspeople